Sheffield University Management School is an AMBA, AACSB and EQUIS accredited business school at the University of Sheffield in Sheffield, England. It is one of 60 business schools in the world to have achieved triple accreditation.

The school has over 50 academics and nearly 2,000 undergraduate and postgraduate students. Led by Dean Professor Rachael Finn, the school is in the top 20 UK Schools in terms of research (Research Assessment Exercise, 2008) and is a member of the UN's PRME Initiative.

In June 2013, the school moved into modern, newly refurbished facilities close to the University of Sheffield campus and Broomhill. It now has dedicated learning and teaching space, a Courtyard, dedicated cafe and Employability Hub.

Research centres and institutes
Sheffield University Management School is home to the following research centres and institutes:
 Institute of Work Psychology (IWP)
 Centre for Regional Economic and Enterprise Development (CREED)
 Logistics & Supply Chain Management Research Centre (LSCM)
 Centre for Energy, Environment and Sustainability (CEES)
 Centre for Decent Work (CDW)
 Centre for Research into Accounting and Finance in Context (CRAFiC)

Research Clusters and Groups
 Behavioural Research for Inclusivity, Sustainability and Technological Transformation (BRISTT) focuses on the impact that consumption, services and technology have on societal wellbeing and the environment.
 Organization Studies (OS) is focused using the following interconnected themes:
 Critical Management Studies - Inequalities, Social innovation, Decolonizing
 Power dynamics and asymmetries - Learning, Development and education, Alternative organisations, Critical leadership, Abuse, mistreatment and bullying
 Language and reflexivity - Qualitative research, Discursive and communication analysis, Ethnography, Participatory research, Cross-cultural research, Decolonizing research and knowledge, Visual methods
 Organisation theory - Organisational culture, Change and evolution, Activism, Identity, Policy transformation, Sociomateriality, Careers

Degree programmes

Undergraduate
The School teaches three main undergraduate programmes: BA Accounting and Financial Management, BA Business Management and BA International Business Management. There are a number of dual honours degree programmes available, for example, BA (Dual Hons) Accounting, Financial Management & Economics. Also, postgraduate programmes are taught, from MA to PhD level.

References

Business schools in England
Management School